Denise K. Woollard (born 1946) is a Canadian politician who was elected in the 2015 Alberta general election to the Legislative Assembly of Alberta representing the electoral district of Edmonton-Mill Creek. In the May 5, 2015 election, she defeated incumbent Progressive Conservative MLA and Speaker of the Legislative Assembly of Alberta, Gene Zwozdesky and other candidates to win the Edmonton Mill Creek seat.

She sought the NDP nomination in the redistributed riding of Edmonton-Meadows for the 2019 election, however she lost the nomination to Jasvir Deol and therefore did not run in the general election.

Electoral history

2012 general election

2015 general election

References

1940s births
Alberta New Democratic Party MLAs
Living people
Politicians from Edmonton
Women MLAs in Alberta
21st-century Canadian politicians
21st-century Canadian women politicians